The 2010–11 USC Trojans men's basketball team represented the University of Southern California during the 2010–11 NCAA Division I men's basketball season. The Trojans, led by second year head coach Kevin O'Neill, played their home games at the Galen Center and were members of the Pacific-10 Conference. They finished the season 19–15, 10–8 in Pac-10 play. They lost in the semifinals of the 2011 Pacific-10 Conference men's basketball tournament to Arizona. They received an at-large bid to the 2011 NCAA Division I men's basketball tournament where they lost in the new First Four round to VCU.

Class of 2010

|-
| colspan="7" style="padding-left:10px;" | Overall Recruiting Rankings:     Scout – UR     Rivals – UR       ESPN – UR 
|}

Roster

2010–11 Schedule and results
 
|-
!colspan=9 style=| Exhibition

|-
!colspan=9 style=| Regular season

|-
!colspan=9 style=| Pac-10 tournament

|-
!colspan=9 style=| NCAA tournament

Notes
 March 11, 2011 – Coach Kevin O'Neill was suspended for USC's game against Arizona. O'Neill had a verbal altercation with a Wildcats booster following the Wednesday game against California.

References

Usc
Usc
USC Trojans men's basketball seasons
USC Trojans
USC Trojans